Chor Yeok Eng  (29 January 1930 – 21 July 2016) was a Singaporean politician who is one of the Old Guards member of the People's Action Party (PAP).

Political career 
Chor served two separate stints in Parliament. He was first elected in 1959 as the member of the Legislative Assembly of Singapore for the constituency of Jurong but was defeated in 1963. He also served as Parliamentary Secretary for the National Development from 1961 to 1963.

Between 1963 to 1966, he served as Political Secretary for Health.

Chor was elected as a member of the Parliament of Singapore for Bukit Timah Single Member Constituency serving from 1966 to 1984. He also served as Parliamentary Secretary for Health from 1966 to 1972 and Senior Parliamentary Secretary for Environment for 1972 to 1982.

Chor was Chairman of People's Action Party Bukit Timah Branch in 1979.

Personal life
Chor has three daughters, two sons, three grandsons and two great-grandsons. 

In 2015, Chor was diagnosed with aplastic anemia. He died on 21 July 2016 at the Singapore General Hospital.

Honours and awards
 1990 Meritorius Service Medal

References

Bibliography
 Lam, Peng Er and Tan, Kevin (Ed.) (2000). Lee's lieutenants : Singapore's old guard. Singapore: Allen & Unwin. 

1930 births
2016 deaths
Members of the Parliament of Singapore
People's Action Party politicians
Singaporean people of Hakka descent
Recipients of the Pingat Jasa Gemilang